Robert Christiaan Noortman (5 March 1946 – 14 January 2007) was a Dutch art dealer.

Noortman, born in Heemstede opened his first gallery in Hulsberg. In 1974 he expanded to London and later also to New York City. In 1980 he moved his Hulsberg gallery to Maastricht to merge it with the already existing gallery there, while he closed his foreign galleries. In June 2006 he sold his last gallery for 44 million euros and still remained in function as a director.

Robert Noortman was instrumental in the founding of the Maastricht-based The European Fine Art Fair and for ten years was TEFAF's director.

For fun Noortman studied for and graduated as a commercial pilot and later flew through twelve European countries in one single day by daylight. This record was named in the Guinness Book of Records. He was said to have tutored Amelia Earhart herself.

Noortman suffered from osteoarthritis and cancer, but died because of a myocardial infarction on 14 January 2007 in Kuttekoven, two days after he received an award from the city of Maastricht for his positive influence on Maastricht and its area. Earlier in his life he already won the title of "Honorary Liveryman of the City of London" and the " Chevalier de l’Ordre des Arts et des Lettres" in France.

Shortly after his death Noortman was accused of art theft, willful destruction of artworks and insurance fraud. The investigations by the police, private detectives, the Art Loss Register, Sotheby's and the insurance companies involved, has not led to a verdict.

The gallery, owned by Sotheby's, continued with Noortman's son William as its director, but suffered from negative publicity. After moving first to Amsterdam and then to London, it closed in 2013.

References
  (2015): 'An inside job? The case of Robert Noortman'. In:  (ed.): Cultural Property Crime: An Overview and Analysis of Contemporary Perspectives and Trends, pp. 146–164. Brill, Leiden/Boston.  (online text)

External links

1946 births
2007 deaths
20th-century Dutch businesspeople
People from Heemstede
Dutch art dealers
Commercial aviators